Gali (Gal) is a town in Abkhazia, Georgia  77 km southeast to Sukhumi. It is the centre of Gali District and was in the United Nations security zone prior to the Russian veto of the UNOMIG Mission in 2009. As of 2011 the town has a population of 7 605 inhabitants.

History
Gali was granted town status in 1932.

On 15 April 1953, the newspaper Izvestia reported that the residents of Gali were celebrating the 132nd birthday of its oldest resident, Tlabgan Ketsba, and that he had founded the town in the 19th century.

See also
 Gali District, Abkhazia

References 

Populated places in Gali District, Abkhazia
Sukhum Okrug